James West (born December 19, 1955) was a linebacker who played twelve seasons in the Canadian Football League for three teams. He won two Grey Cups for the Winnipeg Blue Bombers. Nicknamed Wild West, he played college football at Texas Southern University and trialled with the St. Louis Cardinals in 1984, before joining the Bombers during the 1985 season.

In 2016, he was inducted into the Canadian Football Hall of Fame.

References
4. Canadian Football Hall Of Fame

1957 births
Living people
American players of Canadian football
BC Lions players
Calgary Stampeders players
Canadian Football Hall of Fame inductees
Canadian football linebackers
Players of American football from Fort Worth, Texas
Texas Southern Tigers football players
Winnipeg Blue Bombers players